Haddam is a city in Washington County, Kansas, United States.  It is named after Haddam, Connecticut.  As of the 2020 census, the population of the city was 110.

History
Haddam was founded in 1869. It was named after Haddam, Connecticut. In 1874, the rival town of West Haddam merged with Haddam.

Geography
Haddam is located at  (39.856335, -97.302865).

Demographics

2010 census
As of the census of 2010, there were 104 people, 52 households, and 29 families residing in the city. The racial makeup of the city was 97.1% White, 1.0% Native American, and 1.9% from two or more races. Hispanic or Latino of any race were 1.0% of the population.

There were 52 households, of which 17.3% had children under the age of 18 living with them, 44.2% were married couples living together, 5.8% had a female householder with no husband present, 5.8% had a male householder with no wife present, and 44.2% were non-families. 40.4% of all households were made up of individuals, and 30.7% had someone living alone who was 65 years of age or older. The average household size was 2.00 and the average family size was 2.69.

The median age in the city was 52.8 years. 17.3% of residents were under the age of 18; 6.7% were between the ages of 18 and 24; 10.6% were from 25 to 44; 35.6% were from 45 to 64; and 29.8% were 65 years of age or older. The gender makeup of the city was 44.2% male and 55.8% female.

2000 census
As of the census of 2000, there were 169 people, 73 households, and 48 families residing in the city. The racial makeup of the city was 97.04% White, 1.18% Native American, and 1.78% from two or more races. Hispanic or Latino of any race were 0.59% of the population.

There were 73 households, out of which 21.9% had children under the age of 18 living with them, 61.6% were married couples living together, 4.1% had a female householder with no husband present, and 34.2% were non-families. 34.2% of all households were made up of individuals, and 21.9% had someone living alone who was 65 years of age or older. The average household size was 2.32 and the average family size was 2.96.

In the city, the population was spread out, with 23.7% under the age of 18, 5.3% from 18 to 24, 20.1% from 25 to 44, 23.1% from 45 to 64, and 27.8% who were 65 years of age or older. The median age was 46 years. For every 100 females, there were 128.4 males. For every 100 females age 18 and over, there were 101.6 males.

The median income for a household in the city was $20,000, and the median income for a family was $30,000. Males had a median income of $20,341 versus $14,375 for females. The per capita income for the city was $12,555. About 9.1% of families and 16.3% of the population were below the poverty line, including 26.2% of those under the age of eighteen and 3.4% of those 65 or over.

Education
The community is served by Washington County USD 108 public school district, which formed in 2006 by the consolidation of North Central USD 221 and Washington USD 222. The Washington County High School mascot is Tigers.

School unification consolidated Mahaska and Haddam schools into Haddam-Mahaska schools in 1967. The high school was in Haddam, with grade schools in both communities. In 1968, Haddam-Mahaska combined with Morrowville to form North Central Schools. The grade school and junior high were in Haddam and the high school was in Morrowville.

The Haddam High School mascot was Haddam Hounds. The North Central Junior high mascot was the Wildcats and the high school mascot was the Cougars.

References

Further reading

 Living in the Depot: The Two-Story Railroad Station; H. Roger Grant; University of Iowa Press; 130 pages; 1993; .  Contains historic images of Kansas stations at Alta Vista, Bucklin, Comiskey, Haddam, Hoyt, and Wakarusa.

External links
 City of Haddam
 Haddam - Directory of Public Officials
 Haddam city map, KDOT

Cities in Kansas
Cities in Washington County, Kansas